Itatira is a city in the Brazilian state of Ceará.

References

Itatira
Municipalities in Ceará